A bean-to-bar company produces chocolate by processing cocoa beans into a product in-house, rather than merely melting chocolate from another manufacturer. Some are large companies that own the entire process for economic reasons; others are small- or micro-batch producers and aim to control the whole process to improve quality, working conditions, or environmental impact.

Bean-to-bar chocolate manufacturers

Unsorted
 To'ak Chocolate

See also

 Specialty foods
 List of candies
 List of chocolate bar brands
 List of confectionery brands
 Farm to fork

References

External links
 
 
 

Chocolate manufacturers, bean-to-bar
Chocolate bean-to-bar
Chocolate manufacturers, bean-to-bar